The AFI's 100 Years… series was a series of annual lists from 1998 to 2008 by the American Film Institute—typically accompanied by CBS television specials—celebrating the century of American cinema.

As a centennial celebration of cinematic milestones, the series intended to inspire discussion and public interest in classical Hollywood cinema. As such, each list only included feature-length American films that were typically released before 2005. AFI defined "American film" as an "English language motion picture with significant creative and/or financial production elements from the United States;" and "feature-length film" as a "motion picture of narrative format that is typically over 60 minutes in length."

To determine the composition of these lists, the names of a few hundred nominated films were listed on ballots that AFI would distribute to a jury of over 1,000 leaders in the creative industry, including film artists (directors, screenwriters, actors, editors, cinematographers), critics, and historians.

Lists of the series 
 1998: AFI's 100 Years...100 Movies — top "greatest American films of all time"
 1999: AFI's 100 Years...100 Stars — the 50 greatest American "screen legends" of all time (25 women and 25 men)
AFI defined an “American screen legend” as "an actor or a team of actors with a significant screen presence in American feature-length films whose screen debut occurred in or before 1950, or whose screen debut occurred after 1950 but whose death has marked a completed body of work."
 2000: AFI's 100 Years...100 Laughs — funniest American films
While not specific to any genre, this list generally centered on comedies, including such sub-genres as satire, screwball, slapstick, action comedy, black comedy, musical comedy, romantic comedy, and comedy of manners.
 2001: AFI's 100 Years...100 Thrills — most 'thrilling' American films
This list was not specific to any genre, focussing instead on the total "adrenaline-inducing impact" of a film, engaging both the audience's bodies and minds.
 2002: AFI's 100 Years...100 Passions — the "greatest love stories of all time"
Though not specific to the romance genre, this list concerned films with "a romantic bond between two or more characters, whose actions and/or intentions provide the heart of the film’s narrative."
 2003: AFI's 100 Years...100 Heroes & Villains — the top American film heroes and villains of all time (50 each)
A "hero" was defined as "a character(s) who prevails in extreme circumstances and dramatizes a sense of morality, courage and purpose." A “villain” was defined as "a character(s) whose wickedness of mind, selfishness of character and will to power are sometimes masked by beauty and nobility, while others may rage unmasked."
 2004: AFI's 100 Years...100 Songs — the top American movie songs of all time
For this list, "song" was defined as "[m]usic and lyrics…that set a tone or mood, define character, advance plot and/or express the film’s themes in a manner that elevates" the art of film. Songs can include those "written and/or recorded specifically for the film" as well as those "previously written and/or recorded and selected by the filmmaker to achieve the above goals."
 2005: AFI's 100 Years...100 Movie Quotes — top American film quotes of all time
Selection for this list considered quotes that "circulate through popular culture, become part of the national lexicon and evoke the memory of a treasured film."
 2005: AFI's 100 Years of Film Scores — the 25 greatest American films scores of all time
The list did not originally air on television; it was presented at the Hollywood Bowl during a special live event produced by the Los Angeles Philharmonic Association.
 2006: AFI's 100 Years...100 Cheers — most inspiring American films of all time
Films in this list "inspire" viewers, encourage people "to make a difference," and leave audiences "with a greater sense of possibility and hope for the future."
 2006: AFI's Greatest Movie Musicals — the 25 greatest American musical films of all time
The list did not originally air on television; it was presented at the Hollywood Bowl during a special live event produced by the LA Philharmonic Association.
 2007: AFI's 100 Years...100 Movies (10th Anniversary Edition) — an updated edition of AFI’s "100 Years…100 Movies" list from 1998
This list removed 23 films from the original list, adding in their place 4 films released from 1996–2006 and 19 films made before 1996. 
 2008: AFI's 10 Top 10 — the 10 greatest films in 10 classic American film genres
The 10 genres were: animation, courtroom drama, epic, fantasy, gangster, mystery, romantic comedy, science fiction, sports, and western.

See also 
List of films considered the best

References

External links
AFI's 100 Years...

 
American annual television specials
Lists of American television series
American film-related lists
Centennial anniversaries